A Basket of Clams is a mid-19th century watercolor by American artist Winslow Homer in the collection of the Metropolitan Museum of Art in New York City.

The work, which was one of several Homer painted in the town of Gloucester, Massachusetts, depicts two children carrying a basket of clams as they walk along the beach. It is typical of the vigorous layout and light of Homer's early watercolors, reminiscent of his earlier career as an illustrator.

It is the earliest watercolor by Homer in the Metropolitan Museum and was the gift of  Arthur G. Altschul in 1995.

References 

Paintings by Winslow Homer
Paintings in the collection of the Metropolitan Museum of Art
Paintings of children
Fish in art
Ships in art
1873 paintings